The Fiastra is a river in the province of Macerata in the Marche region of Italy. Its source is in the Sibillini Mountains in Monti Sibillini National Park near Sarnano. It flows northeast near San Ginesio, Loro Piceno and Urbisaglia before entering the Chienti south of Macerata. The historic Abbadia di Fiastra is located near the river.

References

Rivers of the Province of Macerata
Rivers of Italy
Adriatic Italian coast basins